Dorothy Margaret McKinnon  is a New Zealand lawyer, local politician and former deputy mayor of Whanganui.

Biography 
McKinnon has served as the chair of the Whanganui District Health Board, chair of the MidCentral District Health Board and is a member of the Health Practitioners Disciplinary Tribunal.

McKinnon has also served as the chair of the New Zealand Masters Games, a trustee of Serjeant Gallery, a member of Whanganui Collegiate School Board of Trustees, and the Whanganui Community Foundation. She is also the director and chair of the Wellington Rotary District's International Service Committee.

Recognition 
In the 2017 Queen's Birthday Honours, McKinnon received the Queen's Service Medal, for services to the community.

References

Living people
Recipients of the Queen's Service Medal
People from Whanganui
Year of birth missing (living people)
Whanganui District Health Board members